This page list topics related to Cyprus.

0-9
1 April attacks (Cyprus)
1931 Cyprus revolt
1974 Cypriot coup d'état
2012–2013 Cypriot financial crisis
2014 Cyprus talks

A

A1 motorway (Cyprus)
A2 motorway (Cyprus)
A3 motorway (Cyprus)
A4 motorway (Cyprus)
A6 motorway (Cyprus)
A7 motorway (Cyprus)
A9 motorway (Cyprus)
A22 motorway (Cyprus)
Abortion in Cyprus
Abortion in Northern Cyprus
Access to public information in Cyprus
Acheleia
Acheritou
Achna
Afania
Agia Anna, Cyprus
Agia, Cyprus
Agia Marina (Skylloura)
Agia Trias, Cyprus
Agios Andronikos
Agios Athanasios, Cyprus
Agios Chariton
Agios Dimitrios, Cyprus
Agios Georgios, Famagusta
Agios Iakovos
Agios Ilias, Cyprus
Agios Isidoros, Cyprus
Agios Konstantinos, Cyprus
Agios Nikolaos Lefkas
Agios Nikolaos, Paphos
Agios Pavlos, Cyprus
Agios Sergios, Cyprus
Agios Thomas, Cyprus
Agios Vasileios, Cyprus
Agriculture in Cyprus
Agros, Cyprus
Aimery of Cyprus
Air Accident and Incident Investigation Board
Air combat during the Turkish invasion of Cyprus
Akaki, Cyprus
AKEL
Akrotiri and Dhekelia
Alaminos, Cyprus
Alampra
Alexander of Cyprus
Algeria–Cyprus relations
Alkimos Neolaia EOKA
Alona, Cyprus
American International School in Cyprus
Annan Plan for Cyprus
Ancient history of Cyprus
Apollon Limassol
Apostolides v Orams
Ardana
Arediou
Arkadios II of Cyprus
Arcadocypriot Greek
Armenia–Cyprus relations
Armenian Diocese of Cyprus
Armenian education in Cyprus
Armenian Genocide Memorial in Larnaca
Armenian monuments in Cyprus
Armenian religion in Cyprus
Armenians in Cyprus
Armoured vehicles of the Cypriot National Guard
Asha, Cyprus
Arsos, Larnaca
Astromeritis
Arsinoe (Southwest Cyprus)
Assembly of the Republic (Northern Cyprus)
Autonomous Turkish Cypriot Administration
Avlona, Cyprus
Ayia Napa
Ayios Nikolaos, Famagusta
Ayios Nikolaos, SBA
Ayios Nikolaos Station

B

B8 road (Cyprus)
Bangladesh–Cyprus relations
Baldwin of Ibelin, Seneschal of Cyprus
Bank of Cyprus
Battle of Tillyria
Beikioi
Bellapais
BirdLife Cyprus
Boğazköy, Cyprus
Brandy Sour (Cyprus)
British Cypriots
British Cyprus
British Forces Cyprus
British Sovereign Base Areas
Bulgaria–Cyprus relations

C

Canada–Cyprus relations
Cannabis in Cyprus
Cape Apostolos Andreas
Cape Gata
Cape Greco
Cape Kormakitis
Cape Zevgari
Capital punishment in Cyprus
Catholic Church in Cyprus
Central Bank of Cyprus
Charlotte, Queen of Cyprus
China–Cyprus relations
Chloraka
Choli, Cyprus
Chrysostomos I of Cyprus
Chrysostomos II of Cyprus
Church of Cyprus
Cinema of Cyprus
Civilian casualties and displacements during the Cyprus conflict
Climate change in Cyprus
Climate of Cyprus
Coat of arms of Cyprus
Coins of the Cypriot pound
Communications in Cyprus
Conscription in Cyprus
Constitution of Cyprus
Constitution of Northern Cyprus
Coral Bay, Cyprus
Corruption in Cyprus
Council of Ministers (Cyprus)
Council of Ministers (Northern Cyprus)
Culture of Northern Cyprus
Cypriot Americans
Cypriot Arabic
Cypriot Australians
Cypriot Basketball Cup
Cypriot Bichrome ware
Cypriot cuisine
Cypriot Cup
Cypriot euro coins
Cypriot First Division
Cypriot Greek
Cypriot identity card
Cypriot literature
Cypriot mouse
Cypriot National Guard
Cypriot nationalism
Cypriot nationality law
Cypriot passport
Cypriot pound
Cypriot refugees
Cypriot Sign Language
Cypriot Super Cup
Cypriot syllabary
Cypriot Turkish
Cypriot units of measurement
Cypriot wine
Cyprus
Cyprus A gas field
Cyprus Air Forces
Cyprus Airways
Cyprus Airways destinations
Cyprus at the Olympics
Cyprus at the Paralympics
Cyprus Automobile Association
Cyprus Basketball Division A
Cyprus Basketball Federation
Cyprus brandy
Cyprus Broadcasting Corporation
Cyprus Civil Society Awards
Cyprus College
Cyprus College of Art
Cyprus Cricket Association
Christianity in Cyprus
Cyprus Convention
Cyprus Davis Cup team
Cyprus–Denmark relations
Cyprus Development Bank
Cyprus dispute
Cyprus dwarf elephant
Cyprus–Egypt relations
Cyprus Emergency
Cyprus Fire Service
Cyprus Football Association
Cyprus–Georgia relations
Cyprus–Germany relations
Cyprus Government Railway
Cyprus–Greece relations
Cyprus High School
Cyprus–India relations
Cyprus Institute of Marketing
Cypriot intercommunal violence
Cyprus International
Cyprus International Football Tournaments
Cyprus internment camps
Cyprus in the Eurovision Song Contest
Cyprus in the Middle Ages
Cyprus–Ireland relations
Cyprus–Israel relations
Cyprus–Kuwait relations
Cyprus Library
Cyprus lunar sample displays
Cyprus Mail
Cyprus–Malta relations
Cyprus Mathematical Society
Cyprus Mediterranean forests
Cyprus Memorial Forest in Silifke
Cyprus Merchant Marine
Cyprus Military Police
Cyprus Mines Corporation
Cyprus Missile Crisis
Cyprus Museum
Cyprus Museum of Natural History
Cyprus national basketball team
Cyprus national cricket team
Cyprus national football team
Cyprus national rugby union team
Cyprus Navy
Cyprus News Agency
Cyprus–Norway relations
Cyprus Observer
Cyprus Olympic Committee
Cyprus Organisation for Standardisation
Cyprus peace process
Cyprus–Poland relations
Cyprus Police
Cyprus Police Academy
Cyprus Police Aviation Unit
Cyprus Police Museum
Cyprus Popular Bank
Cyprus Port and Marine Police
Cyprus Ports Authority
Cyprus Postal Museum
Cyprus Postal Services
Cyprus Prisons Department
Cyprus–Qatar relations
Cyprus Rally
Cyprus Regiment
Cyprus Red Cross
Cyprus Rugby Federation
Cyprus–Russia relations
Cyprus Sailing Federation
Cyprus–Saudi Arabia relations
Cyprus School of Architecture
Cyprus Science University
Cyprus Securities and Exchange Commission
Cyprus–Serbia relations
Cyprus Space Exploration Organisation
Cyprus State Archives
Cyprus State Fairs Authority
Cyprus Stock Exchange
Cyprus–Sweden relations
Cyprus (theme)
Cyprus–Turkey maritime zones dispute
Cyprus–United Arab Emirates relations
Cyprus–United Kingdom relations
Cyprus–United States relations
Cyprus University of Technology
Cyprus Volleyball Federation
Cyprus Weekly
Cyprus Workers' Confederation
CYTA

D

Dali, Cyprus
Date and time notation in Cyprus
Declaration of Independence of the Turkish Republic of Northern Cyprus
Democratic Party
Democratic Rally
Demographics of Cyprus
Deneia
Denizli, Cyprus
Dhekelia
Districts of Cyprus
Districts of Northern Cyprus
Dora, Cyprus
Doros, Cyprus
Driving licence in Cyprus
Driving licence in Northern Cyprus
Dromolaxia
Drymou
Dymes
Dyo Potamoi

E

Economic Adjustment Programme for Cyprus
Economy of Cyprus
Economy of Northern Cyprus
EDEK
Education in Cyprus
Education in Northern Cyprus
Elaea (promontory of Cyprus)
Elections in Cyprus
Elections in Northern Cyprus
Electricity Authority of Cyprus
Embargo against Northern Cyprus
Embassy of Cyprus in Moscow
Embassy of Cyprus in Washington, D.C.
Emergency Response Unit (Cyprus)
Empa, Cyprus
Enclaved Greek Cypriots
Energy in Cyprus
EOKA
EOKA B
Episkopi, Limassol
Ercan International Airport
Erimi
Esentepe, Kyrenia
Ethnographic Museum of Cyprus
European Party
European University Cyprus
Evangelos Florakis Naval Base explosion
Exclusive economic zone of Cyprus
Exometochi
Extreme points of Cyprus
Extreme points of Northern Cyprus

F

Falcon School Cyprus
Faleia
Famagusta
Faros beach
Fasli
First Cyprus Treasure
Flag of Cyprus
Flag of Northern Cyprus
Foinikas, Cyprus
Football in Cyprus
Football in Northern Cyprus
Foreign relations of Cyprus
Foreign relations of Northern Cyprus
Frederick University
Freedom of religion in Cyprus
Freedom of religion in Northern Cyprus
Fyllia

G

Galata, Cyprus
Galateia 
Galini, Cyprus
Gastria
Geography of Cyprus
Geology of Cyprus
George of Cyprus
Gerani, Cyprus
Gerasa, Cyprus
Geri, Cyprus
Germasogeia
Goudi, Cyprus
Goşşi
Greek Cypriot diaspora
Greek Cypriot name
Greek Cypriot nationalism
Greek Cypriots
Greek military junta of 1967–1974
Gregory II of Constantinople
Guy, Constable of Cyprus
Guy of Ibelin, seneschal of Cyprus

H

Halloumi
Hamitköy
Health in Cyprus
Health care in Cyprus
Hellenic Force in Cyprus
Henry I of Cyprus
Henry II of Jerusalem
Higher Technical Institute of Cyprus
Hinduism in Cyprus
History of Armenians in Cyprus
History of Cyprus
History of Cyprus since 1878
History of medicine in Cyprus
History of nationality in Cyprus
House of Representatives (Cyprus)
Hugh I of Cyprus
Hugh II of Cyprus
Hugh III of Cyprus
Hugh IV of Cyprus
Human rights in Cyprus
Human rights in Northern Cyprus
Human trafficking in Cyprus
Hymn to Liberty

I

Independence Day (Cyprus)
Indians in Cyprus
International Festival of Ancient Greek Drama, Cyprus
International rankings of Cyprus
Isaac Komnenos of Cyprus
Islam in Cyprus
Istinjon, Cyprus

J

James I of Cyprus
James II of Cyprus
James III of Cyprus
Janus of Cyprus
John I of Cyprus
John II of Cyprus
Judiciary of Cyprus
Judiciary of Northern Cyprus

K

Kalo Chorio (Çamlıköy) 
Kalopsida
Kalyvakia, Cyprus
Kampia, Cyprus
Kampos, Cyprus
Kantara monastery
Kantou, Cyprus
Karamoullides
Karmi, Cyprus
Kellia, Cyprus
Khirokitia
King Richard School, Cyprus
Kingdom of Cyprus
KISA - Equality, Support, Anti-Racism
Kiti, Cyprus
Knidos, Cyprus
Koilanemos
Kokkina
Koloni, Cyprus
Komi Kebir
Konia, Cyprus
Kormakitis
Kornos, Cyprus
Kouka, Cyprus
Kourion
Krini, Cyprus
Kykkos Monastery
Kyprianos of Cyprus
Kyra, Cyprus
Kyrenia
Kyrenia District
Kyrenia Mountains
Kyrillos II of Cyprus
Kyrillos III of Cyprus

L

Lala Mustafa Pasha Mosque
Languages of Cyprus
Lapithos
Lapithiou
Larnaca
Larnaca International Airport
Larnakas tis Lapithou
Lasa, Cyprus
Latsia
Law enforcement in Northern Cyprus
Law of Cyprus
Lebanese people in Cyprus
Ledra Street
LGBT history in Cyprus
LGBT rights in Cyprus
LGBT rights in Northern Cyprus
Lemona, Cyprus
Lempa, Cyprus
Liberalism in Cyprus
Limassol
Limnia, Cyprus
Limnitis
Lobby for Cyprus
Louis of Cyprus
Loutros, Cyprus
Lysi

M

MAD TV (Cyprus)
Makario Stadium
Makarios III
Malia, Cyprus
Maratha, Cyprus
Mari, Cyprus
Marion, Cyprus
Maronas, Cyprus
Maronite Catholic Archeparchy of Cyprus
Maronite Cypriots
Media of Cyprus
Media of Northern Cyprus
Melandra, Cyprus
Milia, Famagusta
Military exercises of the Republic of Cyprus
Military of Cyprus
Military operations during the Turkish invasion of Cyprus
Mining industry of Cyprus
Monarga
Moni, Cyprus
Mora, Cyprus
Morphou
Morphou Bay
Moufflon Publications
Mount Olympus (Cyprus)
Mouttagiaka
Movement of Ecologists - Citizens' Cooperation
Movement for Social Democracy
Music of Cyprus

N

Nata, Cyprus
National Library of Cyprus
National Library of Northern Cyprus
Narrow-gauge railways in Cyprus
Neophytos of Cyprus
Neta, Cyprus
New Cyprus Party
New Party (Cyprus)
New Wave – The Other Cyprus
Nicosia
Nicosia International Airport
Nicosia Old General Hospital
Nikitari
North Cyprus Airlines
North Nicosia
Northern Cyprus
Northern Cyprus and the European Union
Northern Cypriot passport
Northern Cyprus citizenship
Northern Cyprus national football team
North Nicosia

O

Officers of the Kingdom of Cyprus
Oikos, Cyprus
Olympus, mountain in Cyprus
Open University of Cyprus
Ora, Cyprus
Order of Makarios III
Orga, Cyprus
Ortaköy, Nicosia
Ottoman Cyprus
Ouzini
Ovgoros

P

Paliometocho
Panagia, Cyprus
Paphos
Pafos Aphrodite Festival Cyprus
Patriotic Front (Cyprus)
Pergamos, Cyprus
Peristerona
Peristeronopigi 
Pervolia
Peter I of Cyprus
Peter II of Cyprus
Petra, Cyprus
Petrofani
Platanisteia
Platani, Cyprus
Plus TV (Cyprus)
Politics of Cyprus
Politics of Northern Cyprus
Polis, Cyprus
Politis (Cyprus)
Postage stamps and postal history of Cyprus
Postage stamps and postal history of Northern Cyprus
Postal codes in Cyprus
Postal orders of Cyprus
Potamia, Cyprus
Pottery of ancient Cyprus
Poverty in Cyprus
Praitori
Prehistoric Cyprus
President of Cyprus
President of Northern Cyprus
Prime Minister of Northern Cyprus
Prodromos, Cyprus
Psathi, Cyprus
Ptolemy of Cyprus
Public holidays in Cyprus
Public holidays in Northern Cyprus
Pyrgos (Cyprus)

Q

Queer Cyprus Association

R

Rebirth Party (Northern Cyprus)
Recognition of same-sex unions in Cyprus
Reduction of military conscription in Cyprus
Religion in Cyprus
Religion in Northern Cyprus
Revenue stamps of Cyprus
Rizokarpaso
Roads and motorways in Cyprus
Royal Navy Cyprus Squadron
Rugby union in Cyprus
Russians in Cyprus

S

Salamis, Cyprus
Sarama, Cyprus
Schools in Cyprus
Scouting and Guiding in Cyprus
Scouts of Northern Cyprus
Secondary education in Cyprus
Section 171 of the Criminal Code of Cyprus
Selemani
Sia, Cyprus
Sinta, Cyprus
Skylloura
Solar power in Cyprus
Solidarity Movement (Cyprus)
Sourp Magar Monastery, Cyprus
Sovereign British Base Areas
Spilia, Cyprus
Sport in Cyprus
Sport in Northern Cyprus
St. John's School, Cyprus
Stelios Kyriakides Stadium
Supreme Court of Cyprus
Swedish Cyprus Expedition

T

Tala, Cyprus
TAK-Cyprus
Tavros, Cyprus
Taxation in Cyprus
Telecommunications in Cyprus
Telephone numbers in Cyprus
Telephone numbers in Northern Cyprus
Television in Cyprus
Television in Northern Cyprus
Ten city-kingdoms of Cyprus
Tenta, Cyprus
Terra, Cyprus
Theatrical Organization of Cyprus
The British Academy of Northern Cyprus
The Cyprus Foundation for Muscular Dystrophy Research
The Cyprus Institute
The Cyprus Times
Time in Cyprus
Timeline of Cypriot history
To Periodiko
Tombs of the Kings (Paphos)
Tourism in Cyprus
Tourism in Northern Cyprus
Trachonas
Trachoni, Limassol
Trade unions in Cyprus
Transport in Cyprus
Trapeza, Cyprus
Trikomo, Cyprus
Troodos Mountains
Tseri
Tsirio Stadium
Turkish Cypriot Chamber of Commerce
Turkish Cypriot diaspora
Turkish Cypriot enclaves
Turkish Cypriot folk dances
Turkish Cypriot Protestants and Anglicans
Turkish Cypriot State
Turkish Cypriots
Turkish Federated State of Cyprus
Turkish invasion of Cyprus
Turkish military forces in Northern Cyprus
Turkish Republic of Northern Cyprus (TRNC)
Turkish settlers in Northern Cyprus
TVOne Cyprus
Two-state solution (Cyprus)

U

Union of Cypriots
United Democrats
United Nations Buffer Zone in Cyprus
United Nations Peacekeeping Force in Cyprus
Universal Life (Cyprus)
University of Cyprus
University of Nicosia

V

Varosha, Famagusta
Vasilikos Power Station
Vehicle registration plates of Cyprus
Vice President of Cyprus
Vietnamese people in Cyprus
Visa policy of Northern Cyprus
Visa requirements for Cypriot citizens
Visa requirements for Northern Cypriot citizens
Vokolida
Vretsia

W

Welfare state in Cyprus
Wildlife of Cyprus
Wine Festival of Cyprus
Women in Northern Cyprus

X
Xerovounos

Y

Z
Zacharia, Cyprus
Zaman (Cyprus)
Zeno of Cyprus
Zodeia
Zygi

Lists
Districts of Cyprus
List of airlines of Cyprus
List of airlines of Northern Cyprus
List of airports in Cyprus
List of amphibians of Cyprus
List of archbishops of Cyprus
List of archives in Cyprus
List of banks in Cyprus
List of birds of Cyprus
List of castles in Cyprus
List of cities, towns and villages in Cyprus
List of colonial governors and administrators of British Cyprus
List of companies of Cyprus
List of Cypriot billionaires by net worth
List of Cypriot consorts
List of Cypriots
List of dams and reservoirs in Cyprus
List of diplomatic missions in Cyprus
List of diplomatic missions of Northern Cyprus
List of earthquakes in Cyprus
List of football clubs in Northern Cyprus
List of football stadiums in Cyprus
List of hospitals in Cyprus
List of Cyprus islets
List of Lebanese people in Cyprus
List of Lepidoptera of Cyprus
List of lighthouses in Cyprus
List of mammals of Cyprus
List of massacres in Cyprus
List of military equipment of Cyprus
List of Ministers of Communications and Works of Cyprus
List of Ministers of Foreign Affairs of Cyprus
List of mosques in Cyprus
List of museums in Cyprus
List of museums in Northern Cyprus
List of newspapers in Cyprus
List of newspapers in Northern Cyprus
List of non-governmental organisations in Cyprus
List of painted churches in Cyprus
List of painters from Cyprus
List of political parties in Northern Cyprus
List of populated places in Northern Cyprus
List of prime ministers of Northern Cyprus
List of radio stations in Cyprus
List of schools in Cyprus
List of supermarket chains in Northern Cyprus
List of tallest buildings in Cyprus
List of United Nations Security Council resolutions concerning Cyprus 
List of universities and colleges in Cyprus
List of universities and colleges in Northern Cyprus
List of wars involving Cyprus
List of World Heritage Sites in Cyprus

See also
Lists of country-related topics - similar lists for other countries

Cyprus